Doug Smith (1963 - 2016) was a composer/pianist who graduated from Kermit High School in 1981 and began classes at Texas Tech University in Lubbock, Texas in the fall of the same year. His goal was to earn a degree in telecommunications but that same year he started working with music recording for the first time and 'Just For You', Smith's first recording, was released in the spring of 1982, is a collection of songs ranging from ragtime originals to romantic ballads.

Since then Smith has published 9 albums:
 Doug Smith - 1989
 A Special Gift - 1992
 Stained Glass - 1993
 The Human Element - 1996
 Piano Player - 1997
 Hope - 1998
 Live - 2000
 Confirmation - 2001
 Cruisin the "G" - 2007

He also has a PBS documentary released in 2003 called "There It Is."

1960s births
2010s deaths
People from Kermit, Texas
American male composers
21st-century American composers
Texas Tech University alumni
Musicians from Texas
21st-century American male musicians